This is a list of seasons completed by the Liberty Flames football team of the National Collegiate Athletic Association (NCAA) Division I Football Bowl Subdivision (FBS). Liberty's first football team was fielded in 1973.

Originally a NAIA team, Liberty moved to the NCAA's Division II in 1981, to Division I-AA (now called the FCS) in 1988, and to the FBS in 2018. Except from 2002 to 2017, when they were members of the Big South Conference, Liberty has been independent of a conference, though they have accepted an invitation to join Conference USA in 2023.

Seasons

The FCS was known as Division I-AA through the 2005 season.

References

Liberty

Liberty Flames football seasons